Claydon railway station was a station in Claydon, Suffolk. It closed to passengers in 1963. The goods facility for Blue Circle Cement, British Steel Piling and Kings Scrapyard was still staffed in the late 1970s with the staff working from the former up side station buildings.

History
The station was opened on 30 November 1849 when the Ipswich and Bury Railway started operation. Initially opened for goods traffic, passenger services commenced on 23 December the same year. The station building was designed by Frederick Barnes who designed a number of stations along the route. Its design is similar to Elmswell railway station which is still extant today (2014).

At the west end of the station, which had two platforms, the line was crossed by the Ipswich to Stowmarket Road although that traffic is now carried on the A14, the level crossing is still quite busy with local traffic.

The Ipswich and Bury Railway was soon merged to become part of the Eastern Union Railway (with whom it shared a number of directors) and this was then taken over by the Eastern Counties Railway in 1854. although these two companies did not formally merge until they amalgamated with other railways to form the Great Eastern Railway in 1862.

The Bradshaws Railway guide for July 1922 shows  down services for Bury St Edmunds and Norwich (generally calling all stations) calling at Claydon. Up services generally terminated at Ipswich calling at Bramford.

In 1923 operation of the station became the responsibility of the London and North Eastern Railway following the 1923 grouping.

On 1 February 1941 the adjacent cement works (see section below) was bombed during the second world war.

On nationalisation operation of the station became the responsibility of the Eastern Region of British Railways.

The station was closed to passengers on 17 June 1963 and the goods yard was closed on 31 March 1971. The down side platforms and structures were demolished soon after closure to passengers to enable the railway layout in the cement factory to be extended. The main building on the upside survived until 1992 although it was demolished despite efforts to have it listed.

The signal box lasted until 1986 when following re-signalling of the main line, electrification and the replacement of the old level crossing barriers by new remote controlled barriers, it had become redundant.

Goods Sidings
The station had a number of goods facilities. Behind the up platform (towards Ipswich and Liverpool Street) there was a railway owned goods yard which included a private coal siding operated by Ipswich Coal merchant Thomas Moy. A cement factory operated by George Mason & Co (sometimes referred to as Masons) was established in the 1913 on the down side of the station. It is unclear whether it was rail connected in 1913 but maps of 1926 show it was rail connected with rail traffic continuing until the closure of the factory in 1999. In 1948 operation of the factory was taken over by APCM (Blue Circle Cement). The company operated a number of quarries in the area which were served by narrow gauge railways.

On the west side of the level crossing on the down side of the line a second goods yard was established in the First World War (1916-1918) and there were used as a railhead for aviation fuel for nearby RAF Wattisham during the Second World War (1939-1945). Later a scrap yard operated at this location.

In 1921 on the down side of the line west of the crossing  the Zenith Works of the British Steel Piling Co Ltd was established. Rail traffic lasted until 1973 with the connection being removed in 1976 although some track was extant in 1986.

About a mile west of the level crossing there is an active (in 2014) aggregates terminal on the up side of the line.

Re-opening?
Plans to redevelop one of the old cement factory quarries into an indoor ski resort called SnOasis have led to suggestions that the station may re-open although whether it will be in the same site due to its proximity to the level crossing is unknown. However, there seems little evidence the project will go ahead in 2014 so it may be some years before the station is reopened.

References

External links
 Claydon station on navigable 1946 O. S. map

Disused railway stations in Suffolk
Former Great Eastern Railway stations
Railway stations in Great Britain opened in 1846
Railway stations in Great Britain closed in 1963
1846 establishments in England